Pierre Tullis (born 8 November 1964) is a South African cricketer. He played in 44 first-class and 7 List A matches between 1984/85 and 1993/94.

See also
 List of Eastern Province representative cricketers

References

External links
 

1964 births
Living people
South African cricketers
Eastern Province cricketers
Northerns cricketers
Cricketers from Johannesburg